Tarinat is the second album of Finnish psytrance-duo Eraser vs Yöjalka. It was released in 2003 by Helsinki-based record label Exogenic Records.

Track listing
"Nippy News" – 5:56
"Tärinät" – 6:22
"Random Sector" – 6:28
"Huon Ona" – 5:57
"Mad John's 12 Euros" – 6:13
"Minor Discomfort" – 6:31
"Spank?" – 6:14
"Paranoid Like a Normal Humanoid" – 5:21
"Hurstinen Kirkkaus" – 7:11
"Hullujen Poikien Kerrosteoria" – 6:11

External links 

 Official homepage of Eraser Vs. Yöjalka

2003 albums
Eraser vs Yöjalka albums